The great Maui rail or great Maui crake (Porzana severnsi) is an extinct bird species from Maui, one of two flightless rails which survived on Maui until people arrived in 150 C.E.

It was the larger of two species of rail found on the island of Maui, Hawaii. Several specimens of this bird were found in early settlements. Its beak was  inch long; its neck was  inches long. It was probably brown and grey and black like its recently extinct relatives the Hawaiian rail and Laysan rail. It was flightless due to its small wings that were on average less than 4 inches long.

It probably fed on the fruits, leaves, and flowers of trees that fell onto the ground, especially those of ‘ōhi‘a lehua (Metrosideros polymorpha), Mamane (Sophora chrysophylla), and Lobelia spp.

The cause of extinction is not well established, but it was likely hunted for meat, and its bones and feathers were used in old style art. It may have also have been predated by Polynesian rats that were introduced by early Polynesian settlers.

External links
  Database entry includes justification for why this species is extinct

Extinct flightless birds
Extinct birds of Hawaii
Porzana
Holocene extinctions
Endemic fauna of Hawaii
Late Quaternary prehistoric birds
Biota of Maui
Birds described in 1973